Henry II (origin and ancestry unknown; died 3 September 1063) was Bishop of Augsburg from 1047 to 1063.

Prior to his episcopal tenure Henry II was a member of the Hofkapelle of Emperor Henry III and, from 1046 to 1047, the head of the Italian chancellery, in which documents that concerned the Italian lands of the Empire were prepared. His career is thus typical of the Ottonian-Salian imperial church. As Bishop of Augsburg, Henry was responsible for the expansion of Augsburg Cathedral and the episcopal palace.

References

Literature

External links 
 Further information at www.mittelalter-genealogie.de

11th-century Roman Catholic bishops in Bavaria
History of Augsburg
Roman Catholic bishops of Augsburg
1063 deaths
10th-century births
11th-century births